Tim Stegerer (born 18 July 1988) is a German footballer who plays for FC Homburg in the Regionalliga Südwest.

Career

Stegerer began his career with 1. FC Saarbrücken. He signed for the club in July 2012, and made his 3. Liga debut in a 1–0 win over VfB Stuttgart II. After Saarbrücken were relegated at the end of the 2013–14 season, he left the club, signing for FC Homburg.

External links

1988 births
Living people
German footballers
1. FC Saarbrücken players
FC 08 Homburg players
SV Auersmacher players
3. Liga players
Regionalliga players
Association football defenders
Association football midfielders
Sportspeople from Saarbrücken